Troy is an unincorporated community in Gilmer County, West Virginia, United States. Troy has a post office with ZIP code 26443.

The community was named after John Troy, a pioneer settler who served as the first postmaster.

References

Unincorporated communities in Gilmer County, West Virginia
Unincorporated communities in West Virginia